Cherokee Park is a neighborhood in southwestern Lexington, Kentucky, United States. Its boundaries are Rosemont Garden on the south, Nicholasville Road to the east, Dantzler Drive, and the Norfolk Southern railroad tracks to the west. It was developed by Dean William S. Taylor in the early 1920s.

Neighborhood statistics

 Area: 
 Population: 76
 Population density: 1,826 people per square mile
 Median household income (2010): $57,280

References

Neighborhoods in Lexington, Kentucky